The Pseudeurotiaceae are a family of fungi in the division Ascomycota. This family can not yet be taxonomically classified in any of the ascomycetous classes and orders with any degree of certainty (incertae sedis).

General characteristics
The general characteristics for members within this family include hyaline or brown ascospores, within a thin-walled ascus inside a cleistothecial ascomata.

See also 
 List of Ascomycota families incertae sedis

References 

Ascomycota enigmatic taxa
Fungus families